Live at the Apollo is a live recording of a 1988 performance by Robert Palmer released in 2001.
All the hits, recorded at the legendary Apollo Theater in Harlem, New York City at the final date, December 15, 1988, of the tour promoting the Heavy Nova album.

Track listing
All songs by Robert Palmer except where noted.
"Some Like It Hot" (Andy Taylor, John Taylor, Robert Palmer) – 5:18
"Hyperactive" (Dennis Nelson, Tony Haynes, Palmer) – 3:13
"Discipline of Love" (David Batteau, Don Freeman) – 3:01
"Tell Me I'm Not Dreaming" (B. Sudano, J. Gruska, Michael Omartian) – 3:32
"I Didn't Mean to Turn You On" (Jimmy Jam and Terry Lewis) – 3:34
"Looking for Clues" – 3:40
"Change His Ways" – 2:59
"Pride" – 3:03
"Woke Up Laughing" – 5:06
"Johnny and Mary" – 3:15
"Riptide" (Gus Kahn, Walter Donaldson) – 2:13
"Between Us" – 3:21
"Flesh Wound" (Frank Blair, Palmer) – 2:39
"More Than Ever" – 3:01
"Simply Irresistible" – 4:20
"Casting a Spell" – 3:20
"Addicted to Love" – 6:27

Personnel 

Robert Palmer - vocals
Eddie Martinez - guitar
Frank Blair - bass
Dony Wynn - drums
Brie Howard - percussion
Alan Mansfield - keyboards
David Rosenthal - keyboards
BJ Nelson - vocals

The album is dedicated to: David "Cowboy" Conyers

References 

Robert Palmer (singer) albums
2001 live albums
Eagle Records live albums
Albums recorded at the Apollo Theater
Albums produced by Robert Palmer (singer)